Alexandru Guță Tănase (born 12 September 1923, date of death unknown) was a Romanian footballer who played as a striker. He was the first footballer of Gaz Metan Mediaș that played for Romania's national team.

International career
Alexandru Tănase played one friendly match for Romania, on 8 May 1949 under coach Colea Vâlcov in a 2–1 victory against Poland.

References

External links
 

1923 births
Year of death missing
Romanian footballers
Romania international footballers
Place of birth missing
Association football forwards
Liga I players
CS Gaz Metan Mediaș players
CSM Jiul Petroșani players
Romanian football managers
CS Gaz Metan Mediaș managers